The Akbar Express is a passenger train operated daily by Pakistan Railways between Quetta and Lahore.

History
The Akbar Express was previously known as the Quetta Express. In August 2013, it was renamed to Akbar Express in honour of Nawab Akbar Khan Bugti, a Baloch nationalist leader and former head of the Jamhoori Wattan Party. Pakistan Railways suspended the train in 2010 due to lack of locomotives but was resumed on 25 April 2013.

Route
Originally, the Quetta Express ran between Quetta and Peshawar via Rohri, Multan, Lahore and Rawalpindi. Since being renamed to Akbar Express, the route has been shortened to Lahore via Faisalabad.

 Quetta–Rohri Junction via the Rohri–Chaman Railway Line
 Rohri Junction–Khanewal Junction via the Karachi–Peshawar Railway Line 
 Khanewal Junction–Sangla Hill Junction via the Khanewal–Wazirabad Branch Line
 Sangla Hill Junction–Shahdara Bagh Junction via the Shahdara Bagh–Sangla Hill Branch Line
 Shahdara Bagh Junction–Lahore Junction via the Karachi–Peshawar Railway Line

Station stops

Equipment
Akbar Express consists of ten coaches and four rakes with AC Standard, First Class Sleeper and Economy Class accommodations.

See also
 Pakistan Railways

References

Named passenger trains of Pakistan
Passenger trains in Pakistan
Quetta
Rail transport in Balochistan, Pakistan